Narong Thongpleow (born 29 September 1947) is a Thai former footballer who competed in the 1968 Summer Olympics.

References

External links
 

1947 births
Living people
Narong Thongpleow
Narong Thongpleow
Footballers at the 1968 Summer Olympics
Southeast Asian Games medalists in football
Narong Thongpleow
Association football midfielders
Competitors at the 1967 Southeast Asian Peninsular Games
Narong Thongpleow
Narong Thongpleow